Aušra Bimbaitė (born October 10, 1982) is a former Lithuanian professional basketball player. She played for Dynamo Kursk and Lithuania women's national basketball team. She has represented national team in several EuroBasket Women competitions. She has spent all her career in Lithuania, except 2009-10, and 2011-13 season when she played for Dynamo Kursk.

References

External links
 FIBA Europe profile
 Basketnews 

1982 births
Living people
Lithuanian women's basketball players
People from Rokiškis
Shooting guards